The women's freestyle 51 kilograms is a competition featured at the 2013 World Wrestling Championships, and was held at the László Papp Budapest Sports Arena in Budapest, Hungary on 18 September 2013.

This freestyle wrestling competition consisted of a single-elimination tournament, with a repechage used to determine the winners of two bronze medals.

Results
Legend
F — Won by fall

Final

Top half

Bottom half

Repechage

References
Results Book, Page 82

Women's freestyle 51 kg
World